Armando González can refer to:

 Armando González (athlete) (born 1940), Uruguayan long-distance runner
 Armando González (footballer), Paraguayan footballer
 Armando González (rowing) (1931–2022), Spanish Olympic rowing coxswain